Ratna Pariksha is an ancient science on testing gemstones. It was used by Kosadhyaksha (Superintendent of Treasury) mentioned in Kautilya's Arthashastra  in order to control business of pearl, diamonds and all important gems in the ancient times. It classifies gemstones into Maha-Ratna and Upa-ratna

History
Ratna Praiksha is mentioned in Kautilya's Arthashastra (323-299 B.C.). Vatsayana of Kamasutra mentions about rupa-ratna-pariksha. The method was also studied by princes in Karnataka during the medieval period.

The author of this treatise is very commonly known to be Buddha Bhatt. There is also mention of another author in medieval period, Thakkar Pheru, who is again credited to have worked on this subject. There's a mention of Vaidyaraj Shri Radha Krisha Navetia who uses Ratna Pariksha for preparing a type of alcohol meant in the use of gem therapy.

References

Bibliography

Categories

Gemology
Jewellery industry in India